Juan Kahnert (4 March 1928 – 3 September 2021) represented Argentina at the 1948 Summer Olympics in London, he was entered in the shot put. His personal best in the shot put was 16.75 in 1956.

References

1928 births
2021 deaths
Argentine male shot putters
Olympic athletes of Argentina
Athletes (track and field) at the 1948 Summer Olympics
Pan American Games medalists in athletics (track and field)
Pan American Games silver medalists for Argentina
Athletes (track and field) at the 1951 Pan American Games
Medalists at the 1951 Pan American Games